Gymnoschoenus is a genus of tussock-forming grasses in the family Cyperaceae.

References

Cyperaceae
Cyperaceae genera